Achar  may refer to:

Achar (Buddhism), a lay Buddhist ritual specialist in Cambodia.
 Acar, Dutch/Indonesian pickle
 Achar people, an ethnographic group of Georgians
 Achar or Achan (biblical figure), an Israelite referred to in the Book of Joshua and the First Book of Chronicles
 Achar, Uruguay, a town in the Tacuarembó Department of Uruguay
 Achar!, a 2004–2005 Singaporean English-language sitcom
 Achar (crater), a crater on Mars
 South Asian pickle, a food native to South Asia

See also
 Acar (disambiguation)
 Achara clan, a Jat clan of Rajasthan
 Atchara, Philippine pickled papaya